Ectaga is a genus of moths of the family Depressariidae.

Species
 Ectaga canescens Walsingham, 1912
 Ectaga garcia Becker, 1994
 Ectaga lenta Clarke, 1956
 Ectaga lictor Walsingham, 1912
 Ectaga promeces Walsingham, 1912

References

 
Depressariinae